Perryman is an unincorporated community and census-designated place (CDP) in Harford County, Maryland, United States. The population was 2,342 at the 2010 census.

History
St. George's Parish Vestry House was listed on the National Register of Historic Places in 1976. Amtrak's Northeast Corridor high-speed rail line runs through the community; however, Amtrak and MARC trains do not stop as there is no station.

Geography
Perryman is located in southern Harford County at  (39.468509, −76.213090). It is bordered to the west by Church Creek and the Bush River, an arm of Chesapeake Bay; to the south by Sod Run, an inlet of the Bush River; to the east by Chelsea Road and Aberdeen Proving Ground; and to the north by the city of Aberdeen. The community of Riverside touches the northwest side of Perryman.

U.S. Route 40 (Pulaski Highway) runs through the northern part of Perryman, leading northeast  to Elkton and southwest  to downtown Baltimore.

Climate
The climate in this area is characterized by hot, humid summers and generally mild to cool winters. According to the Köppen Climate Classification system, Perryman has a humid subtropical climate, abbreviated "Cfa" on climate maps.

Demographics

As of the census of 2000, there were 2,461 people, 960 households, and 696 families residing in the CDP. The racial makeup of the CDP was 71.76% White, 24.42% African American, 0.24% Native American, 0.81% Asian, 0.69% from other races, and 2.07% from two or more races. Hispanic or Latino of any race were 2.64% of the population.

There were 960 households, out of which 37.5% had children under the age of 18 living with them, 47.0% were married couples living together, 21.5% had a female householder with no husband present, and 27.5% were non-families. 21.9% of all households were made up of individuals, and 6.1% had someone living alone who was 65 years of age or older. The average household size was 2.55 and the average family size was 2.94.

In the CDP, the population was spread out, with 28.7% under the age of 18, 7.5% from 18 to 24, 29.7% from 25 to 44, 23.0% from 45 to 64, and 11.1% who were 65 years of age or older. The median age was 36 years. For every 100 females, there were 88.4 males. For every 100 females age 18 and over, there were 83.3 males.

The median income for a household in the CDP was $33,972, and the median income for a family was $40,938. Males had a median income of $35,979 versus $24,944 for females. The per capita income for the CDP was $17,236. About 17.5% of families and 17.4% of the population were below the poverty line, including 29.4% of those under age 18 and 2.9% of those age 65 or over.

References

Census-designated places in Harford County, Maryland
Census-designated places in Maryland